Jordan Brower (born October 14, 1981) is a former American movie actor.

Biography 

Jordan was born in Lompoc, California but moved to Texas at an early age. It is there where he got his first break into acting when a film crew from The Big Green notified his soccer coach of auditions. After his soccer coach persuaded him to audition, he got a leading role. Jordan had a supporting role in ABC's TGIF comedy Teen Angel and also worked on Social Studies, a short lived comedy television show detailing the lives of boarding school kids. Since then he has been in several films with minor roles with perhaps his biggest role in the 1998 film Speedway Junky, with Jesse Bradford, Jonathan Taylor Thomas, and Daryl Hannah. Jordan played the role of Eric, a gay hustler in Las Vegas who begins to fall in love with Bradford's straight character, Johnny. The film was shot in 1998, but wasn't released until late August in 2001.

Filmography

Film

Television

References

External links

1981 births
Male actors from Texas
Living people